Orbyn Leger (born 13 March 1997) is a New Zealand rugby union player who has represented the Blues, Chiefs and Hurricanes in the Super Rugby competition.

Leger is a first five-eighth for Karaka who went to Hamilton Boys' High School. He began his playing career in 2015 at first five-eighth for the Samoa Under 20s side before switching allegiance to New Zealand for the 2016 and 2017 editions of the tournament. Leger is one of only a handful of players to attend 3 different Under 20s World Championships.

He is the son of former Counties Manukau midfielder Gus Leger who played 15 tests for Tonga and represented New Zealand at softball. Leger also played Touch Rugby and Softball at Regional and National representative level.  He is of Tongan, Māori, Samoan and Fijian descent.

Leger continued his rise through the ranks in New Zealand rugby with another stellar performance with the U20s and Counties Manukau which saw him being included in the Blues 2018 Super Rugby training squad. He made his Super Rugby debut playing at center for the Blues against the Sunwolves in Japan in 2018. He then made 7 appearances for the Blues in his debut Super Rugby season in 2018.

Leger has obtained 9 Super Rugby caps and is currently training with the Hurricanes squad for 2021. He was also the co-captain of the 2020 Counties Manukau Steelers alongside team-mate, Lyndon Dunshea.

References 

New Zealand rugby union players
1997 births
Living people
Rugby union fly-halves
Rugby union centres
Counties Manukau rugby union players
Blues (Super Rugby) players
Chiefs (rugby union) players
Hurricanes (rugby union) players
Shimizu Koto Blue Sharks players
Rugby union players from Auckland